Tom Taggart is a Canadian politician, who was elected to the Nova Scotia House of Assembly in the 2021 Nova Scotia general election. He represents the riding of Colchester North as a member of the Progressive Conservative Association of Nova Scotia.

Prior to his election to the legislature, Taggart served on the Colchester County council. He previously ran in Colchester North in the 1993 Nova Scotia general election, losing to Ed Lorraine.

Electoral record

References

Year of birth missing (living people)
Living people
Progressive Conservative Association of Nova Scotia MLAs
21st-century Canadian politicians
Nova Scotia municipal councillors
People from Colchester County